Viraasat is an Indian Hindi-language drama television series that debuted on STAR Plus, with broadcast of the series later shifting to STAR One. It aired from 12 June 2006 to 26 July 2007. It was produced by B.R. Films.

Story 
Viraasat is the story of two people in love bound by an age-old enmity between their families.

Cast 
 Kiran Kumar as Raman Lamba
 Deepak Qazir as Kailash Kharbanda
 Aman Verma as Rishabh Lamba (Raman's Middle Son)
 Pooja Ghai Rawal as Anushka Rishabh Lamba
 Amar Upadhyay as Kunal Kharbanda (Kailash's Son)
 Manasi Salvi as Gargi Kunal Kharbanda
 Rohit Roy as Rahul Lamba (Raman's Youngest Son)
 Sangeeta Ghosh as Priyanka Kharbanda (Kailash's Daughter) / Priyanka Rahul Lamba 
 Jayati Bhatia as Meera Raman Lamba
 Simone Singh as Anushka Rishabh Lamba
 Smita Bansal as Gargi Kunal Kharbanda
 Vishal Watwani as Ronnie
 Kanika Maheshwari as Juhi Lamba (Rohan's Daughter)
 Chinky Jaiswal as Shaina Kharbanda (Kunal & Gargi's Daughter)
 Gautam Chaturvedi / Akshay Anand as Rohan Lamba (Raman's Eldest Son)
 Ankur Nayyar as Dr. Raj Malhotra
 Chhavi Mittal as Niki (Anushka's Sister)
 Gajendra Chauhan as Yashwant Vij
 Sanjeet Bedi as Sanjay Vij (Yashwant's Son)
 Amit Pachori as Inspector Vishal Deshmukh
 Ravee Gupta as Tanya
 Karishma Tanna as Natasha Chopra
 Hrishikesh Pandey as Shekhar Sinha
 Aashish Kaul as Professor Vardhan
 Nitin Trivedi as College Principal
 Kaushal Kapoor as Gargi's Advocate
 Adi Irani as Fake Dr. M. D. Virmani
 Shahab Khan as Bhaskar Dey
 Sanjay Swaraj as Kishore Bhagat
 Cindrella D' Cruz as Receptionist
 Salim Shah as Mr. Marwah

Production
The series premiered and aired on StarPlus in prime time slot until January 2007. On 22 January 2007, it was shifted to Star One due to the programming changes of StarPlus for its flagship show Kaun Banega Crorepati's premiere and also as the series did not garner expected ratings in Star Plus.

The series was made with a high budget of ₹ 20 crores.

Reception
Rediff.com applauded the series as one of the best launch of the year 2006 stating, "Virasat had to be successful with such a massive star cast and strong screenplay. Stellar performances by Sangeeta Ghosh and Aman Verma guarantee the success of this serial."

References

External links 
 
Official website

2006 Indian television series debuts
2007 Indian television series endings
Indian drama television series
Star One (Indian TV channel) original programming
StarPlus original programming